Louise Pauline Mainguené, known as Sylvie (3 January 1883 – 5 January 1970), was a French actress.

The daughter of a sailor and a teacher, Sylvie entered an acting conservatory where she won a class comedy award unanimously. She started her professional career in 1903 and she earned her first success with The Old Heidelberg. She first appeared in French silent films. She was an actress known for Don Camillo (1952), The Shameless Old Lady (1965), and Le Corbeau (1943).

She was born on 3 January 1883 in Paris and died on 5 January 1970 in Compiègne, France.

She won the first National Society of Film Critics Award for Best Actress in 1966 for her performance in The Shameless Old Lady.

Partial filmography

 Germinal (1913) - Catherine
 Le coupable (1917) - Louise Rameau
 Roger la Honte (1922) - Henriette Laroque
 Crime and Punishment (1935) - Catherine Ivanova
 Life Dances On (1937) - La maîtresse de Thierry
 The Lafarge Case (1938) - Adélaîde Lafarge
 The Curtain Rises (1938) - Clémence
 The White Slave (1939) - Safète - la mère de Vedad
 The End of the Day (1939) - Madame Tusini
 La Comédie du bonheur (1940) - Madame Marie
 Ecco la felicità (1940) - Signora Marie
 Romance of Paris (1941) - Madame Gauthier
 Montmartre (1941) - Madame Courtin
 The Man Without a Name (1943) - Madame Ourdebey
 Marie-Martine (1943) - La mère de Maurice
 Angels of Sin (1943) - La prieure
 Le Corbeau (1943) - La mère du cancéreux
 Traveling Light (1944) - Madame Renaud
 The Island of Love (1944) - La voyante
 Father Goriot (1945) - Mademoiselle Michonneau
 Manon, a 326 (1945)
 Le pays sans étoiles (1946) - Madame Nogret
 The Idiot (1946) - Madame Ivolvine
 That's Not the Way to Die (1946) - Suzanne Bouvier
 Passionnelle (1947) - La baronne de Marsannes
 Miroir (1947) - La religieuse
Coincidences (1947) - Amélie
 La révoltée (1948) - Mademoiselle Barge
 Two Loves (1949) - Mme Vincent
 Tous les deux (1949) - Mme Gendron
 White Paws (1949) - La mère de Maurice
 God Needs Men (1950) - Coise Karbacen
 Under the Sky of Paris (1951) - Mademoiselle Perrier
 Little World of Don Camillo (1952) - Signora Cristina
 We Are All Murderers (1952) - Laetitia Bollini
 Forbidden Fruit (1952) - Madame Pellegrin mère
 Thérèse Raquin (1953) - Madame Raquin
 A Slice of Life (1954) - Zelinda (segment "Casa d'altri")
 Ulysses (1954) - Eurycleia
 Black Dossier (1955) - Mme. Baju
 Michel Strogoff (1956) - Marfa, mère de Strogoff
 Les Truands (1957) - Clarisse Benoit
 Le Miroir à deux faces (1958) - Mme Tardivet
 Quai du Point-du-Jour (1960) - Madame Dupont
 Croesus (1960) - Delphine
 Family Diary (1962) - Grandmother
 Nutty, Naughty Chateau (1963) - La grand-mère / Grandmother
 The Shameless Old Lady (1965) - Madame Berthe Bertini
 Black Humor (1965) - La mère Belhomme - segment 1 'La Bestiole"

References

External links 
 

1883 births
1970 deaths
Actresses from Paris
French silent film actresses
20th-century French actresses